"RWLYD (Really Wanna Let You Down)" is the lead single from Canadian alt-rock band, MONOWHALES, off their debut album Daytona Bleach. The song is considered the band's breakout hit, reaching No. 2 on the Canadian alternative rock chart, making them the only self-managed, unsigned band to do so. 

In an interview with The Harlton Empire, drummer and songwriter Jordan Circosta said "I remember us all really struggling with our mental health around the time we wrote RWLYD. There was a lot of pressure on us surrounding the release of 'Control Freak' and a lot of internal pressures in the band as we questioned the way forward. The song took shape around the idea of pushing back against those forces and the release that comes from failing to live up to unrealistic expectations."

Track listing

Charts

References 

2019 singles
Canadian alternative rock songs